Pía Belén Soto Infante (born January 22, 1997. Santiago), best known as Belén Soto, is a Chilean actress, Writer and model. Her role debut was in Papi Ricky (a Chilean TV serie of 2007).

Life and career 

Soto was born in January 1997 in Chile, was daughter of Aldo Soto and Carolina Infante, also has a sister and a brother. In 2011 Aldo Soto died due to cardiac arrest because he was suffering of cancer.
She finished highschool in Colegio San Francisco Javier and thinks to keep with her career studying in an acting school.

She started recording audios for Chilean station radios and at 10 years old she made her debut in the Canal 13 (Chile) Chilean TV series Papi Ricky as Alicia, an 8-year-old little girl.

Belén is considered as a Chilean Barbie in most countries of Latin America for make television publicity for children TV channels
Soto actually is a magazine model called the new "it girl made in Chile"

In 2014 she went as invited to the program TV series Mujeres Primero and said she was threatened with death if she attending a concert of Justin Bieber by beliebers.

Filmography

Books

Awards

References 

1997 births
Living people
21st-century Chilean actresses
Chilean television actresses